The 1981–82 National Football League was the 51st staging of the National Football League (NFL), an annual Gaelic football tournament for the Gaelic Athletic Association county teams of Ireland.

Kerry defeated Cork in the final after a replay.

Format

Titles
Teams in all four divisions competed for one league title.

Divisions
 Division One: 8 teams
 Division Two: 8 teams
 Division Three: 8 teams 
 Division Four: 8 teams

Round-robin format
Each team played every other team in its division once, either home or away.

Points awarded
2 points were awarded for a win and 1 for a draw.

Knockout stage qualifiers
 Division One:  top 4 teams
 Division Two: top 2 teams 
 Division Three: top team
 Division Four: top team

Knockout phase structure
In the Preliminary quarter-finals, the match-ups were as follows
 Preliminary Quarter-final 1: Fourth-placed team in Division One v First-placed team in Division Four
 Preliminary Quarter-final 2: Second-placed team in Division Two v First-placed team in Division Three

In the quarter-finals, the match-ups were as follows
 Quarter-final 1: Winner Preliminary Quarter-final 1 v First-placed team in Division Two
 Quarter-final 2: Winner Preliminary Quarter-final 2 v Third-placed team in Division One

The semi-final match-ups are:
 Semi-final 1: First-placed team in Division One v Winner Quarter-final 1
 Semi-final 2: Second-placed team in Division One v Winner Quarter-final 2

Separation of teams on equal points

In the event that teams finish on equal points, then a play-off will be used to determine group placings if necessary, i.e. where to decide relegation places or quarter-finalists.

Group stage

Division One

Regulation games

Play-offs

Table

Division Two

Play-offs

Table

Division Three

Table

Division Four

Table

Knockout stages

Preliminary quarter-finals

Quarter-finals

Semi-finals

Final

References

External links

National Football League
National Football League
National Football League (Ireland) seasons